John Tracy Ellis (July 30, 1905 – October 16, 1992) was a Catholic Church historian and priest, born and raised in Seneca, Illinois, USA.

Ellis was ordained a priest and received a doctorate in history from Catholic University of America in Washington, where he worked with Msgr. Peter Guilday to collect the central documents of the American Catholic heritage. 

He spent most of his career as a faculty member of the Catholic University, but he taught at the University of San Francisco between 1963 and 1976. He was a long serving executive secretary of the American Catholic Historical Association and editor of the Catholic Historical Review (1941–62). Ellis is best known for his 1952 argument that American Catholic scholars have failed to measure up to European Catholic standards of scholarship and intellectual leadership.

Career
He wrote widely on church history, including a major biography of James Cardinal Gibbons. He attracted widespread attention in Catholic circles for his essay (1955) deploring an anti-intellectual "ghetto mentality" among American Catholics.

In his book American Catholicism, first published in 1956, he wrote that a "universal anti-Catholic bias was brought to Jamestown in 1607 and vigorously cultivated in all the thirteen colonies from Massachusetts to Georgia."

In 1978, Ellis received what is regarded as the highest honor for US Catholics, the University of Notre Dame's Laetare Medal.

Legacy
Several of Msgr. Ellis's students at Catholic University went on to make contributions to church history, including: Fr. Patrick H. Ahern, Fr. William Au, Fr. Colman J. Barry, OSB, Fr. Henry J. Browne, Sr. Margaret Carthy, OSU, Fr. Joseph P. Chinnici, OFM, Fr. Michael Roach, Cardinal Archbishop Timothy Dolan, Sr. Alphonsine Frawley, Fr. James Hennesey, SJ, Archbishop Oscar Hugh Lipscomb, Anabelle Melville, Fr. Peter J. Rahill, Fr. David Sweeney, OFM, Fr. Thomas J. Shelley, and Msgr. Francis J. Weber.

He was named by Pope Pius XII, a domestic prelate with the title monsignor, an honorific priestly status, in 1955. In 1989, Pope John Paul II further elevated him to Protonotary Apostolic, the highest grade of monsignor. He is interred in Mt. Calvary Cemetery on the north side of Seneca.

Published works
Ellis, John Tracy. Cardinal Consalvi and Anglo-Papal Relations, 1814-1825. Washington, DC: Catholic University of America Press, 1942.
Ellis, John Tracy. The Life of James Cardinal Gibbons, Archbishop of Baltimore. Milwaukee, Wis.: Bruce Pub. Co., 1952.
Ellis, John Tracy. Catholic Bishops: A Memoir. Wilmington, Delaware: Michael Glazier, 1983.
Ellis, John Tracy. A Commitment to Truth. Latrobe, PA.: The Archabbey Press, 1966.
Ellis, John Tracy. "American Catholics and the Intellectual Life." Thought. 30 (1955), 351-88.
Ellis, John Tracy. Faith and Learning: A Church Historian's Story. Lanham, Md.: University Press of America, 1989.
Ellis, John Tracy. American Catholicism. Chicago, IL: The University of Chicago Press, 1956.
Ellis, John Tracy. "The Formative Years of the Catholic University of America". Washington, D.C.:Murray & Heister

References

Works cited
Minnich, Nelson H., Robert B. Eno, S.S., and Robert F. Trisco. Studies in Catholic History in Honor of John Tracy Ellis. Wilmington, Delaware: Michael Glazier, 1985.
Shelley, Thomas J. "The Young John Tracy Ellis and American Catholic Intellectual Life." U.S. Catholic Historian. 13:1 (Winter 1995), 1-18
Shelley, Thomas J. "Ellis, John Tracy (1905-1992)" in Michael Glazier, ed. The Modern Catholic Encyclopedia (1994) pp 277–78
Thomas, Jack Douglas. "Interpretations of American Catholic Church History: A Comparative Analysis of Representative Catholic Historians, 1875-1975." Ph. D. Diss.: Baylor University, 1976.  Treats Ellis's work, in addition to historians John Gilmary Shea, Msgr. Peter Guilday, Theodore Maynard, and Fr. Thomas McAvoy CSC.

External links
Article in Commonweal Magazine
New York Times article
Article in America Magazine
Biography at CatholicAuthors.com

Catholic University of America alumni
Historians of the Catholic Church
People from Seneca, Illinois
1905 births
1992 deaths
Laetare Medal recipients
20th-century American historians
Catholics from Illinois
20th-century American Roman Catholic priests
Presidents of the American Society of Church History